Distancia (Distance) is a 1998 album by José José for BMG. The album went triple-gold. All songs except for “Ojalá que te mueras” which was sent to him or his team by Abel Del Rio but was never accredited for were written by Argentine songwriter and producer Roberto Livi and Rafael Ferro. Livi had already worked with the singer 1992 on "40 y 20" and two  hit albums, as well as Mujeriego 1996.

Track listing
 "La llamaban María"
 "Triste tarde gris"
 "Distancia"
 "Cariño"
 "No hay otro remedio" (Roberto Livi/J. Madeira) 
 "Ojalá qué te mueras"
 "Amar sin ser amado"
 "Sin ti"
 "Cómo duele"

References

1998 albums
José José albums